Christian Myekeni Ntshangase (died 16 January 2021) was a Swazi politician.

Biography
He was the Minister of Public Service of Eswatini from 2019 until his death in 2021. Ntshangase died from COVID-19.

References

20th-century births
2021 deaths
Government ministers of Eswatini
Deaths from the COVID-19 pandemic in South Africa